Roger Boylan is an American writer (b. 1951) who was raised in Ireland, France, and Switzerland. His Irish novel Killoyle, called "a virtuoso performance" by Publishers Weekly, is published by Dalkey Archive Press. His second Irish novel,  The Great Pint-Pulling Olympiad, is published by  Grove Press; the Village Voice said it resembled the work of James Joyce "at his comically prolix best." Both novels were translated into German by the award-winning German translator and author Harry Rowohlt. The third volume in the Killoyle trilogy, The Maladjusted Terrorist, was published in German in 2007, and the entire Killoyle trilogy was reissued as a boxed set that year by the Swiss publisher Kein und Aber.

Killoyle was published in Italian translation in 2013 by Edizioni Nutrimenti, Rome. The translator was Mirko Zilahi de Gyurgokai.

The Irish novels were followed by a European one, The Adorations, which deals satirically with historical and religious themes, including Nazism, the Occupation of France, and mystical visions. It was published in 2012 as an e-book in English under the Olympiad Press imprint, and in print form by Dalkey Archive Press in January 2020. "The Adorations is Boylan's magnum opus," says one review, "moving like a fugue through the history of 20th-Century Europe."

Boylan's latest novel is Ohiowa Impromptu, a Killoyle-like footnoted satire set in New Ur, an imaginary university town in Ohiowa, an imaginary Midwestern state. It is forthcoming.

Boylan is a regular contributor to Boston Review's New Fiction Forum, and his stories, reviews, and articles have appeared in many journals and reviews, including The New York Times Book Review and The Economist. He has recently completed a memoir, Run Like Blazes. He currently lives in Texas.

Boylan is married and has a daughter, Margaret Boylan.

Works
Killoyle, An Irish Farce, Dalkey Archive Press, May 1997.
The Great Pint-Pulling Olympiad, Grove Press, October 2003. 
Killoyle, Eine Irische Farce. Translated by Harry Rowohlt. Published by Rogner und Bernhard, Hamburg, 1999.
Rückkehr nach Killoyle : Eine Vorwiegend Irische Farce. Translated by Harry Rowohlt. Rogner und Bernhard, Hamburg, 2002.
The Maladjusted Terrorist. Forthcoming in English.
Killoyle Wein und Käse. Translated by Harry Rowohlt. Rogner und Bernhard, Berlin, 2006.
The Adorations. Olympiad Press, July 2012. Dalkey Archive Press, January 2020. 
Run Like Blazes. Duvel Press, June 2011.

References

External links
Review of Killoyle by Harvey Pekar, Austin Chronicle, Vol. 17, No. 8.
Review of Killoyle, Publishers Weekly.
Review of The Great Pint-Pulling Olympiad, The Village Voice.

1951 births
Living people
American male writers
Alumni of the University of Edinburgh
International School of Geneva alumni